Kapuas Hulu Regency is a regency in  West Kalimantan province of Indonesia. Located around Kapuas River, it has a total area of 29,842.03 square kilometres or around 20.26% of West Kalimantan province's area. The regency seat is located in town of Putussibau, where most of its economic and government activities take place. Due to its relatively large area, it is sparsely populated compared to neighbouring regencies around it. The regency had a population of 222,160 at the 2010 Census and 252,609 according to the 2020 Census; the official estimate as at mid 2021 was 253,740.

History 

The area was under kingdom of Selimbau, which was under influence of Sultanate of Sambas in early 17th and 18th century. Other than it, there were several smaller kingdoms and Malay chieftains such as Suhai, Jongkong, and Bunut, scattered around the region.

On 1823, Dutch settlers began exploring the region and Dutch colonial government signed a treaty with kingdom of Selimbau, acknowledging its domination over smaller kingdoms and chieftains in the region. Over time, the kingdom gradually lost its autonomy and the last king of Selimbau, Haji Gusti Usman, abdicated on 1925. The region was incorporated into Dutch East Indies and administrated from Sintang.

During Japanese occupation of Dutch East Indies, the region was administrated by Imperial Japanese Navy from Banjarmasin. Japanese opened a coal mine around Mentabah and Tebaung river in 1942 to support their war effort on Pacific. The locals welcomed Japanese at first, thought them to be liberator from Dutch rule. However, due to exploitation and treatment on locals, they turned against the Japanese later on. It was estimated around 1,000 native worked as Rōmusha died in the region during Japanese occupation. The occupation resulted in Majang Desa War or more popularly known as Dayak Desa War, with Japanese expelled from Borneo interior as the result. One of leader's war and Dayak chieftain, nicknamed Pang Suma, today is regarded as hero not only in the region but also Indonesia in general. The region became an autonomous royal region within West Kalimantan in 1946 and later became a regency under Law Number 3 of 1953.

There has been ongoing discussion about forming a new province, Kapuas Raya, which would include Kapuas Hulu as part of it, to be separated from West Kalimantan. However, due to a moratorium on new administrative division creations for financial reason during COVID-19 pandemic, its creation has been put on halt by the Indonesian government.

Geography 
The regency borders Sarawak in the north, Sintang Regency in the west and south, and East Kalimantan as well as Central Kalimantan in the east. Soil formation in the region is considered to be one of the oldest in Indonesian archipelago. There are numerous lakes, swamps, and wetlands in the region and lower region is often submerged by water from nearby rivers as long as six months a year. Settlements are mostly located around rivers due to historical importance of inland waterways in the past. There are 925,134 hectares of national park, 834.140 hectares of protected forest, and 769,000 hectares of production forest.

The regency has tropical climate with temperature between 22.9 and 33.5 Celsius, with 84.6% air humidity, and 38% sunlight intensity. The wettest month is May with average rainfall of 547.66 mm3, and the driest is August with average 222.2 mm3.

Governance

Administrative districts 
At the time of the 2010 Census, the regency was divided into 25 administrative districts (kecamatan). However this has since been reduced to 23 by the amalgamation of the former Danau Sentarum District into Selimbau District, and the amalgamation of the former Hulu Kapuas District into Putussibau Selatan District. The regency seat, Putussibau, consists of the urban parts of two districts, which are North Putussibau and South Putussibau; both form the first and second most populous districts in the regency. Due to regency seat not having clear official boundaries, the estimated population of the town could be as high as 50,000 people depending on where the speculative border is drawn; but both districts include extensive rural regions. Below is a list of the districts with their areas and their populations according the 2010 and 2020 Censuses, as well as the official estimates as at mid 2021. The table also includes the locations of the district administrative centres and the number of administrative villages (rural desa and urban kelurahan) in each district.

Notes: (a) including 5,880 in the former Hulu Kapuas District. (b) including 3,868 in the former Danau Sentarum District.

Local government 
The regency is a second-level administrative division equivalent to a city. As a regency, it is headed by a regent who is elected democratically. Head of districts are appointed directly by the regent with the recommendation of the regency secretary. Executive power lies with the regent and vice regent, while legislative function is exercised by the regency's parliament.

Politics 
On provincial parliament, the regency is part of 7th West Kalimantan electoral district together with Melawi Regency and Sintang Regency which together sends 11 out of 65 representatives. On regency level, it is divided into four electoral districts that in total has 30 representatives. The last election was in 2019 and the next one is in 2024.

Economy 

Agriculture and construction are the biggest sector in the regency as of 2020. Agriculture consisted of 23% of the regency's gross regional product, while construction consisted of 22.42%. Manufacture industry is the third largest sector, with account of 11.28% of the regency's gross regional product. The most rapid growth is found on information and communication sector with figure of 7.02% as of 2020, while general service sector declined as many as 17.93% in the same year. Agriculture employed 62.61% of the regency's workforce, followed by service sector with 22.14% and manufacture with 15.25%.

The regency produced total around 680 tons of various vegetables such as cucumber and water spinach. Other than that, there were total 174,195 tons of fruit production in the regency due to significance of fruit plantation in regency's agriculture sector. The regency also produced 375 tons of rubber and 5 tons of coffee bean in the same year. Significant livestock includes chicken, with total meat production of 1,305 tons on 2020. In addition, there are 132,064 pigs, 3,991 goats, and 161,777 cows population. Despite being landlocked, the regency also has significant fish catch, mostly from aquaculture and freshwater catches. Significant species from the regency included Nile tilapia with 7,073 tons, Clarias with 3,760 tons, Channa micropeltes with 17,007 tons, and Pangasius with 4,236 tons. There are noted 5,297 fish ponds used for aquaculture in the regency with total area of 8,258 hectares and 7,930 keramba with total area of 15,860 hectares. The actual figure is possibly higher due to informal nature of Indonesian economy. Tourism is a growing sector in the regency, especially ecotourism. There are 60 hotels in the regency as of 2020, and the regency was visited by 2,339 international tourists as well as 6,805 domestic tourists. In total there are 116 registered restaurants in the regency.

Unemployment rate on 2020 was 4.02% and poverty rate was 8.99%.

Demographics 
As with most places in Indonesia, the population is generally young and consist of reproductive age workforce. From the population, as of 2020 there are 146,654 people considered as part of workforce above age 15. Two most populous as well as most densely populated districts, North and South Putussibau, contain nearly 20% of the regency's population. Population growth was 3.48% with sex ratio of 105.5, meaning there are around 105 men per 100 women population. Dominant religion in the regency is Islam, with figure 150,276 Muslims as of 2020, followed by 76,276 Catholics, 20,568 Protestants, 332 Confucianist, 279 Buddhist, 22 Hindu, and two people identify as folk religion follower.

Infrastructure 

There are total 33 kindergartens, 417 elementary schools, 118 junior highschools, 37 senior highschools, and 6 vocational highschools, in addition of two higher education institutions as of 2020. One of the higher education institutions is Tarbiyah College, which is a private college focused on Islamic studies. The other higher education institution, is a branch of Pontianak State Polytech. It is state-owned and the main campus is located in city of Pontianak with smaller branch for Kapuas Hulu located in North Putussibau District.

On healthcare sector, there are three hospitals, 132 puskesmas, and 183 village healthcare centers in the regency as of 2020. One of the main hospital, Dr. Achmad Diponegoro General Hospital, or sometimes referred as Putussibau General Hospital, is a public hospital and owned by the regency government. It is classified as C-class hospital by Ministry of Health. On 2020, the hospital received building rehabilitation and expansion for new buildings. Other hospital, Pratama Semitau Hospital, is a private hospital and relatively new, inaugurated on 2019 and classified as D-class hospital. Badau Bergerak Hospital, located in Badau District, is the only hospital located outside of Putussibau and also owned by regency government as public hospital. In addition of that, there are total 28 family planning clinics.

There are exactly 505 mosques, 490 churches, and four Chinese Buddhist temple in the regency as of 2019. Total roads in the regency as of 2020 was 1,108.330 kilometers, out of which 217.340 kilometers have been paved with asphalt. The regency is served by Pangsuma Airport, which located in Putussibau and have regular flights between Pontianak and Sintang. There's also regular bus route from Pontianak to Putussibau managed by Perum DAMRI. In Putussibau, usage of online ride-hailing app service is also present.

References

Regencies of West Kalimantan